Marepaphias (also mar(e)pahis) was a Lombard title of Germanic origin meaning "master of the horse," probably somewhat analogous to the Latin title comes stabuli or constable. According to Grimm, it came from mar or mare meaning "horse" (see modern English mare) and paizan meaning "to put on the bit".

It has been translated as "shield-bearer".

Notes

References

Further reading
Hodgkin, Thomas. Italy and her Invaders. Clarendon Press, 1895.
Abel, Otto. Paulus Diakonus und die ubrigen Geschichtschreiber der Langobarden. 2nd edition revised by Dr. Reinhard Jacobi. Leipzig, 1888.

Titles
Honorifics
Lombards